Robert Hammond aka Bob Hammond is an author, film producer, public speaker and occasional actor. He is the author of Ready When You Are: Cecil B. DeMille’s Ten Commandments for Success, Life After Debt and Repair Your Own Credit.

Background
In addition to speaking publicly, Hammond is also a consumer advocate. He has been featured on numerous radio and television in the United States discussing matters relating to debt and financial management. In his publications he has said the only hope  to survive and prosper in the approaching cashless society is to get out of debt and clean up your credit rating. His novel C. B. DeMille: The Man Who Invented Hollywood looks at DeMille's film career and also his beginnings as a failed stage actor.

Publications
Hammond's Life After Debt which was published by Career Press in 2000 was the third in a series of popular self-help books, with the first published in 1993. It addresses some of the warning signs of credit trouble such as paying the minimum payment, using credit cards to obtain cash advances. It even advises cutting them up. Life Without Debt looks at the psychology behind the slide into debt and how people are seduced into situations where they create bills that they can't pay.  In his 2001 publication, Repair Your Own Credit, he writes that 70% of Americans have derogatory info in their credit histories and to beware of companies that charge up front fees of several hundred dollars to clean one's credit. He also writes in the book that one needs to know how to contact credit bureaus, look at reports, and how to determine what is and isn't accurate. He also advises not to close a 5 year old credit card that has been used only once as it can wipe out favoreable credit history.

His novel The Light is a story about Abel Adams who fights his way through drug addiction.

Film

Production

References

External links
 

Year of birth missing (living people)
Living people
American male writers